Alf Egil Holmelid (born 13 December 1947) is a Norwegian engineer and politician for the Socialist Left Party.

He was research manager at the University of Agder from 2002 Holmelid was elected to the Norwegian Parliament from Vest-Agder in 2009. for the term 2009–2013.

References

1947 births
Living people
People from Fjaler
Members of the Storting
Vest-Agder politicians
Socialist Left Party (Norway) politicians
21st-century Norwegian politicians